The Under Secretary for Public Diplomacy and Public Affairs is currently a top-10 ranking position in the U.S. Department of State that is intended to help ensure that public diplomacy is practiced in combination with public affairs and traditional diplomacy to advance U.S. interests and security. The Under Secretary oversees three bureaus at the Department of State: Educational and Cultural Affairs, Public Affairs, and International Information Programs. Also reporting to the Under Secretary are the Office of Policy, Planning and Resources for Public Diplomacy and Public Affairs and the Advisory Commission on Public Diplomacy.

The position was created on October 1, 1999, during the Clinton administration after Title XIII, Section 1313 of the Foreign Affairs Reform and Restructuring Act of 1998 (112 Stat. 2681-776). Section 2305 of the Act (112 Stat. 2681-825) increased the number of Under Secretaries of State from five to six. Subdivision A of the Act, also known as the Foreign Affairs Agencies Consolidation Act of 1998, abolished the United States Information Agency and the Arms Control and Disarmament Agency.

The duties of Under Secretary were filled in an acting capacity by Michelle Giuda until her return to private industry in March of 2020. After Giuda, Ulrich Brechbuhl filled in an acting capacity starting on March 3, 2020. Nilda Pedrosa filled the role in an acting capacity from September 28, 2020 to January 20, 2021.

As of April 4, 2022, Elizabeth M. Allen is the acting Under Secretary, by designation.

Full appointments to the position require confirmation by the Senate.

From October 1, 1999, through August 29, 2019, the Under Secretary has been without a confirmed appointment 35.8% of the days. The average time between confirmed appointments is 289 days (or over 9.5 months). Looking at the last three administrations, the office was without a confirmed Under Secretary for 37.2% of the Bush Administration, 21.8% of the Obama Administration, and 89.4% of the Trump Administration (as of August 29, 2019).

List of Under Secretaries of State for Public Diplomacy and Public Affairs

References

External links
Website of the Under Secretary for Public Diplomacy and Public Affairs
Publicdiplomacy.org
Margaret D. Tutweiler leaves the Department of State for the New York Stock Exchange
The Office of the Historian's list of former Under Secretaries

 
1999 introductions
Public relations in the United States